Michael Yeboah may refer to:
 Michael Yeboah (footballer, born 1997), Ghanaian football midfielder for Medeama S.C.
 Michael Yeboah (footballer, born 2001), Ghanaian football midfielder for Las Vegas Lights FC, on loan from Accra Great Olympics